New Court may refer to:
 Corpus Christi College, Cambridge#New Court
 New Court, Emmanuel College, Cambridge
 St John's College, Cambridge#New Court's Clock Tower
 Trinity College, Cambridge#New Court
 Old Court – New Court controversy 19th-century political controversy in the U.S. state of Kentucky

See also
 Newcourt (disambiguation)